Gibbula spurca is a species of sea snail, a marine gastropod mollusk in the family Trochidae, the top snails.

Description
The size of an adult shell varies between 8 mm and 12 mm. The small, solid shell is globose-conical, sculptured with fine, shallow, revolving alternate grooves and elevations. The yellowish shell is shining and  delicately variegated with oblique zigzag dusky lines. The two colors are about in equal proportions with a series of somewhat conspicuous quadrate dusky and yellow spots just below the suture. There are four or five ventricose whorls. The  suture is deeply impressed. The base is moderately conical, imperforate or minutely umbilicated. The aperture is very oblique. The rounded columella is arcuate.  The outer subnacreous lip is sharp and smooth.

Distribution
This species occurs in the Atlantic Ocean off Madeira and the Canary Islands.

References

 Gofas, S.; Le Renard, J.; Bouchet, P. (2001). Mollusca, in: Costello, M.J. et al. (Ed.) (2001). European register of marine species: a check-list of the marine species in Europe and a bibliography of guides to their identification. Collection Patrimoines Naturels, 50: pp. 180–213

External links
 Gastropods.com: Gibbula (Gibbula) spurca; accessed = 3 July 2011

spurca
Gastropods described in 1856